Tikal National Park is a national park located in Guatemala, in the northern region of the Petén Department. Stretching across 57,600 hectares, it contains the ancient Mayan city of Tikal and the surrounding tropical forests, savannas, and wetlands. In 1979, Tikal National Park was declared as a World Heritage Site by UNESCO, because of the outstanding Mesoamerican ruins at Tikal and the unique ecology of the surrounding landscape.

History
"Project Tikal", as it was named at the time, was first proposed by the University of Pennsylvania in 1949. Founded on May 26, 1955, Tikal National Park was established under government decree by the Ministry of Education, via the Instituto de Antropología e Historia, advised by Dr. Adolfo Molina Orantes and under the government of Carlos Castillo Armas. Once established, the University of Pennsylvania played a role in the park's cleaning, maintenance, excavation and restoration of the site from 1956 to 1969.

Today, Tikal National Park's main tourist attraction is the classical, Mayan city Tikal, which is surrounded by a dense, lush forest.

Ecology
Tikal National Park makes up part of the global Man and the Biosphere Programme, within the Maya Biosphere Reserve. Because of its lush and varied ecosystem, many species of plants and animals thrive within the park boundaries. Five species of cats reside within the park, including the jaguar and puma, along with several species of monkeys and anteaters.  In addition, more than 300 species of birds are found in the park, including the crane hawk and the ocellated turkey.

References

External links

Guatemalan Government Official Site for Tikal, Ministry of Culture and Sports of Guatemala 
Aproximación a la conservación arqueológica en Guatemala, Asociación Tikal 

National parks of Guatemala
World Heritage Sites in Guatemala
Tikal